Polyscias balfouriana, known as Balfour aralia or dinner plate aralia, is a species in the family Araliaceae. The species is native from New Guinea to Queensland, Australia.

It is a bushy shrub. Leaves are alternate and have long petioles. Flowers are white with 5 petals.

The specific epithet honors John Hutton Balfour. The species is often grown in cultivation as an ornamental.

References

balfouriana